This is a partial listing of prominent political families of Pakistan given in alphabetical order.

Azhar 

 Mian Muhammad Azhar  (Governor of Punjab, 1990-1993, Mayor of Lahore 1987-1991, founder of PMLN-Q)
 Hammad Azhar  (Previous Finance Minister of Pakistan)

Babar
 Nawabzada Nasrullah Khan
 Naseerullah Babar
 Farhatullah Babar

Bangash
 Ghulam Ishaq Khan, President of Pakistan.

Bhuttos
 Shah Nawaz Bhutto - The Dewan of Junagadh and the Father of Zulfiqar Ali Bhutto (Member Bombay Council).
 Zulfikar Ali Bhutto, son of Shah Nawaz (President (1970–1973); Prime Minister (1973–1977))
 Mumtaz Bhutto, cousin of Zulfikar, (chief of Bhutto tribe, former chief minister and Governor of Sindh, Federal Minister of Pakistan)
 Nusrat Bhutto, wife of Zulfikar (former minister without portfolio)
 Benazir Bhutto, daughter of Zulfikar (Prime Minister, 1988–1990 and 1993–1996), assassinated December 27, 2007.
 Murtaza Bhutto, elder son of Zulfikar Ali Bhutto and the brother of former Prime Minister of Pakistan Benazir Bhutto. He was assassinated.
 Shahnawaz Bhutto, son of Zulfikar Ali Bhutto. He died under mysterious circumstances.
 Ameer Bux Bhutto, son of Mumtaz Bhutto, Vice President of Sindh National Front and ex-Member of Sindh Assembly.
 Fatima Bhutto, daughter of Murtaza Bhutto.
 Bilawal Bhutto Zardari, son of Benazir Bhutto and Asif Ali Zardari, party chairman.
 Bakhtawar Bhutto Zardari, daughter of Benazir Bhutto and Asif Ali Zardari, Party Chairman

Bukharis
 Zulfi Bukhari, Special Assistant to Prime Minister Imran Khan
 Altaf Bukhari, Member in the Jammu and Kashmir Legislative Assembly
 Uzma Zahid Bukhari, Member of the Provincial Assembly of Punjab
 Zehra Batool, Member of the Provincial Assembly of the Punjab
 Syed Basit Sultan Bukhari, Member of the National Assembly of Pakistan
 Ajiaz Hussain Shah Bukhari, Member of the Provincial Assembly of Sindh
 Syed Samsam Bukhari, Former Member of the National Assembly of Pakistan
 Syed Ata-ul-Muhaimin Bukhari, President of Majlis-e-Ahrar-ul-Islam
 Syed Yawer Abbas Bukhari, Member of the Provincial Assembly of the Punjab
 Nayyar Hussain Bukhari, Senior leader of the Pakistan Peoples Party (PPP)
 Ejaz Hussain Bukhari, Member of the Provincial Assembly of the Punjab

Chaudhary Rajput
 Asiya Azeem Chaudhary (She was elected for her second term as Member, National Assembly of Pakistan on August 17th 2022). She was previously Member of the 12th National Assembly of Pakistan from 2002 till 2007.

Chaudhary Jatt
 Ch Muhammad Saqlain (He was elected for the third term as Member, Provincial Assembly of Punjab in general elections 2008 independently. Former MPA is now PTI's candidate for the constituency NA-66 Jhelum-I).
 Chaudhry Zahoor Elahi (A parliamentarian who played a major role in the restoration of democracy and human rights in Pakistan)
 Chaudhry Shujat Hussain (Prime Minister of Pakistan - 2004)
 Chaudhry Pervaiz Elahi (Chief Minister of Punjab - October - 2002 to October 2007)
 Chaudhry Wajahat Hussain, Former Federal Minister of Human Resources
 Chaudhary Moonis Elahi, MNA, Federal Minister for Water Resources
 Chaudhary Salik Hussain, MNA, Federal Minister of Board of Investment & Special Initiatives  
 Chaudhary Hussain Elahi, MNA
 Chaudhry Fawad Hussain, Former Federal Minister of Information & Broadcasting

Chattha Jatt
 Hamid Nasir Chattha, Former Speaker of the National Assembly.

Gabol
 Allah Bakhsh Gabol, Member Bombay Legislative Assembly 1928, Member Sindh Legislative Assembly 1937 and Mayor of Karachi for two terms.
 Nabil Gabol (Grandson of Khan Bahadur Allah Bakhsh and son of Ahmed Khan Gabol), Member Sindh Assembly 1988, 1993, 1997; Member National Assembly 2002, 2008 and Federal Minister for Ports and Shipping.

Gandapur
 Inayatullah Khan Gandapur, former Chief Minister of KPK (1973-1975). Served as KPK finance minister between 1972 and 1973.
Ikramullah Gandapur, former Minister of Agriculture in KPK, important leader in Kulachi area.
 Israrullah Khan Gandapur, member of KPK assembly from 2002-2013. Served as minister of Law, Parliamentary Affairs, and Human Rights.
Aghaz Ikramullah Gandapur, youngest ever member of KPK assembly, elected in 2018 following death of his father.
Ali Amin Gandapur,Federal Minister for Kashmir Affairs and Gilgit-Baltistan

Gujjars/Chaudhry 
 Adil Pervaiz Gujjar, MPA-PTI, son of Pervaiz Sultan MPA Sammundari, Faisalabad
 Fazal Ilahi Chaudhry, Former President of Pakistan
 Chaudhry Muhammad Jaffar Iqbal, Senior Vice-President of PML-N.
 Qamar Zaman Kaira, Former Governor of Gilgit-Baltistan and Minister of Information.
 Tanveer Ashraf Kaira, Former Minister of Finance and General Secretary of PPP Punjab.
 Shafqat Mehmood, Federal Minister of Education/ E -Information and Petroleum.
 Chaudhry Zaka Ashraf, Former Chairman Pakistan Cricket Board and the owner of ZTBL.
 Malik Abrar Ahmad, MNA chairman PHA.
 Sardar Muhammad Yousuf, Religious minister.
 Fayyaz Ul Hassan Chohan, Former Information Minister, Punjab
 Chaudhry Amir Hussain, Former Speaker National Assembly 
 Nawabzada Ghazanfar Ali Gul, Former MNA/Minister 
 Chaudhry Muhammad Akhlaq, Minister of Special Education, Punjab
 Akhtar Ali Vario, Former MPA/Minister C&W /Minister for Excise /Chairman Standing Committee Narcotics/Special Assistant to Chief Minister /Chairman District Council Sialkot
 Choudhary Khush Akhtar Subhani, Former MPA/Minister population welfare/Prisons/Housing & Physical Planning/Environmental Planning
 Tariq Subhani, Former MPA
 Armaghan Subhani, Current MNA/ Ex MPA/provincial minister

Jadoon 
 Iqbal Khan Jadoon, Former Chief Minister, NWFP
 Amanullah Khan Jadoon, Former Minister of Petroleum and Gas.

Khar Jat
 Ghulam Murtaza Raheem Khar
 Ghulam Mustafa Khar, former Governor of Punjab and former Chief Minister of Punjab
 Ghulam Noor Rabbani Khar, politician
 Hina Rabbani Khar, daughter of Ghulam Noor Rabbani Khar
 Malik Ghulam Raza Rabbani Khar
 Malik Ghulam Arbi Khar MNA 1993
 Safina Saima Khar wife of Malik Ghulam Arbi Khar

Khattaks
 Habibullah Khan Khattak
 Ali Kuli Khan Khattak, Military General
 Ghulam Faruque Khan
 Nasrullah Khan Khattak
 Ajmal Khattak
 Afrasiab Khattak
 Parvez Khattak

Khattar
 Nawab Muhammad Hayat Khan CSI, early member of the Punjab legislature in the 19th c
 Sir Sikandar Hayat Khan, KBE, Premier/CM of the Punjab 1937-1942.
 Sir Liaqat Hayat Khan, KCSI, Prime Minister of Patiala state in British India.
 Sardar Shaukat Hayat Khan, senior political figure and close associate of MA Jinnah.
 HE Izzet Hayat Khan, former Pakistani ambassador to Tunisia
 Ghulam Sarwar Khan, Minister of Petroleum and (Member National Assembly of Pakistan)
 Tahir Sadiq Khan,(Member National Assembly of Pakistan) and former district nazim Attock
 Muhammad Zain Elahi, Former (Member National Assembly of Pakistan)

Khokhars
 Ghazanfar Ali Khan - Former Minister of Food, Agriculture and Health, Ambassador to Iran 1948-1952, to Turkey 1952-1953, to India 1954-1956 and to Italy 1956-1957.
 Riaz Khokhar  (Former Foreign Secretary of Pakistan serving from June 2002 to February 2005)
 M. Nawaz Khokhar (Former Deputy Speaker of the National Assembly of Pakistan)
 Malik Ahmad Khan Bhachar (Member Provisional Assembly of Punjab)
 Afzal Khokhar (Member National Assembly of Pakistan)
 Malik Saif ul Malook Khokhar (Member National Assembly of Pakistan)
 Malik Muhammad Ali Khokhar (Member Provisional Assembly of Punjab)
 Mustafa Nawaz Khokhar (Member Senate of Pakistan)
 Karam Elahi Bandial (Member Provisional Assembly of Punjab)
 Malik Ali Abbas Khokhar (Member Provisional Assembly of Punjab)
 Malik Karamat Khokhar (Member National Assembly of Pakistan)

Leghari 
 Farooq Leghari (ex President of Pakistan)
 Jamal Leghari 
 Awais Leghari
 Muhammad Mohsin Khan Leghari
 Rafique Haider Khan Leghari
 Muhammad Arshad Khan Leghari

Marwats
 Habibullah Khan Marwat, Justice of the West Pakistan High Court, first & second Chairman of the Senate of Pakistan, acting President of Pakistan, when the President Fazal Ilahi Chaudhry went abroad, Pakistan's Interior Minister and also Chief Minister of West Pakistan. Was elected to the first ever Legislative Council of Khyber Pakhtunkhwa (then North-West Frontier Province NWFP), first as a member and later Deputy Speaker.
 Shah Nawaz Khan, ex-Chief Justice of Khyber Pakhtunkhwa and Judge of the Supreme Court of Pakistan.  He was also Governor of NWFP.

Saifullah Khan family
 Begum Kulsum Saifullah Khan, member of Majlis-Shoora of General Zia-ul-Haq
 Salim Saifullah Khan, Senator of Pakistan, President Pakistan Muslim League
 Anwar Saifullah Khan, MPA, Senator, and former federal minister, and son-in-law of President Ghulam Ishaq Khan.
 Humayun Saifullah Khan, MNA.

Mazari 
 Sardar Mir Balakh Sher Mazari ( Tumandar Mazari Tribe(1930-Present), Former Care taker Prime minister of Pakistan)
 Shaukat Hussein Mazari (Former MPA, Punjab Assembly, former Deputy-Speaker, former provincial ministerPunjab Assembly)
 Sardar Atif Hussein Mazari (Former MPA, Punjab Assembly)
 Sardar Saleem Jan Mazari (Former MNA, former Provincial Minister from Sindh and former district Nazim Kashmore)
 Sardar Ehsan ur Rehman Mazari ( MNA Kashmore)
 Sardar Mir Dost Muhammad Mazari (Former MNA & Minister for water power, MPA & Deputy speaker Punjab assembly)

Mian Family of Baghbanpura
 Justice Mian Shah Din, (1868–1918), Elected President of the All-India Muslim League(March 1908), Member of the Simla Deputation in 1906, First Muslim Judge in British India, Poet and Writer.
 Sir Mian Mohammad Shafi, KCSI, CIE (1869–1932), one of the founding fathers & President All India Muslim league (Punjab)
 Justice Sir Mian Abdul Rashid (29 June 1889 – 6 November 1981), Kt, KCSI, was the first Chief Justice of Pakistan 1947, legal philosopher, one of the founding fathers of Pakistan
 Mian Sir Muhammad Shah Nawaz, Politician of Punjab in the 1920s
 Mian Iftikharuddin, Politician, owner of Pakistan Times and Daily Imroz, 1947–1962
 Begum Jahanara Shahnawaz (1896–1979) politician in Pakistan, first woman to preside over an Asian legislature. Founder All India Women Muslim League in 1935
 Mumtaz Shahnawaz (1912-1948) - young woman political activist and author, who died in a tragic plane crash at the age of 35

Mohmand
 Muhammad Ali Khan Mohmand
 Babar Ali Khan Mohmand

Myer Minhas Rajput 
 Raja Muhammed Sarfraz Khan, MLC Punjab 1929, MLA 1937-58
 Muhammed Akbar Khan, Pakistan's first four star general
 Iftikhar Khan, Pakistan's first designated army chief
 Iffat Liaqat Ali Khan, Ex- Chairman Task Force Pakistan
 Sher Ali Khan, Minister Minerals and Mines Punjab
 Raja Riaz Ahmad Khan, Ex-Senior Minister Punjab, MNA
 Raja Yassir Humayun Sarfraz, Minister for Higher Education & IT, Punjab

Noon family 
 Feroz Khan Noon (former Prime Minister of Pakistan, former Foreign Minister of Pakistan, former Chief Minister of Punjab)
 Malik Adnan Hayat Noon (former MNA)
 Malik Anwar Ali Noon (former MNA)
 Malik Amjad Ali Noon (former District Nazim)
 Viqar un Nisa Noon (former Federal Minister as well as a prominent social worker)
 Rana Muhammad Qasim Noon (Member of National Assembly NA-159 2018-23, MNA 2013-18, Former Minister)

Qazi family 
Members of Qazi family, of Sindh in politics:
 Qazi Abdul Majeed Abid (Qazi Abid), a four-time Federal Minister, Sindh Provincial Minister, and son of Qazi Abdul Qayyum
 Fahmida Mirza, Speaker of the National Assembly, former Acting President of Pakistan, three-time Member of the National Assembly, and daughter of Qazi Abid
 Zulfiqar Mirza, Sindh Provincial Home Minister, former Member of the National Assembly, and nephew of Qazi Abid, Qazi Azam, and Qazi Akbar.
 Pir Mazhar Ul Haq, Senior Minister and Education Minister in the Sindh Provincial Cabinet, a three-time Sindh Provincial Minister, and grandson of Qazi Muhammad Akbar
 Marvi Mazhar, a former Member of the Provincial Assembly in Sindh and daughter of Pir Mazhar Ul Haq.

Rana 
 Rana Abdul Rauf, MPA District Bahawal Nagar
 Rana Chander Singh, was a Pakistani politician and a federal minister. He was one of the founder members of Pakistan Peoples Party (PPP) and was elected to the National Assembly of Pakistan from Umerkot, seven times with PPP between 1977 and 1999
 Rana Hamir Singh, a Pakistani politician who has been member of Provincial Assembly of Sindh.
 Rana Mashood Ahmad Khan, Deputy Speaker of the Fourteenth Provincial Assembly of the Punjab in Pakistan
 Rana Muhammad Iqbal Khan, 16th Speaker of the Provincial Assembly of the Punjab, Acting Governor of Punjab in 2011.
 Rana Muhammad Afzal
 Rana Phool Muhammad Khan, Ex Minister of agriculture, Ministry of Health, Law Minister of Pakistan, Caretaker Chief Minister of Punjab
 Rana Sanaullah Khan, 39th Interior Minister of Pakistan
 Rana Tanveer Hussain, (Member of National Assembly) (Ex Federal Minister)

Rao 
 Rao Mohammad Hashim Khan, Member of National Assembly, ex-Chairman Public Accounts Committee
 Rao Muhammad Ajmal Khan, Member of National Assembly
 Rao Sikandar Iqbal, Ex-Federal Minister
 Rao Qaiser Ali Khan, Ex-MNA
 Rao Muhammad Afzal Khan, MPA from Sahiwal District Tehsil Depalpur
 Rao Jamil Akhtar Khan, Tehsil Nazim Okara
 Rao Farman Ali Pakistan Army
 Rao Qamar Suleman Pakistan Air Force

Sharif (Butt)  

 Nawaz Sharif,  Ex Prime Minister of Pakistan(exile from country by gen. Musharaf in 1999 thru Martial Law)
 Shahbaz Sharif, Prime Minister of Pakistan (exile from country by gen. Musharaf in 1999 thru Martial Law)
 Hamza Shahbaz Sharif, Son of Shahbaz Shareef, (Member of National Assembly of Pakistan,Chief Minister of Punjab (Pakistan)
 Hussain Nawaz son of Nawaz Sharif (Prime Minister of Pakistan)
 Maryam Nawaz, daughter of Nawaz Sharif and wife of Rtd. Captain Safdar

Soomro 
 Khan Bahadur Allah Bux Soomro, Twice Chief Minister of Sindh
 Elahi Bux Soomro, remained Member of National Assembly of Pakistan, Speaker National Assembly of Pakistan, Federal Minister
 Rahim Bux Soomro, Minister Sindh
 Mohammad Mian Soomro, remained President of Pakistan, Prime Minister of Pakistan, Senate of Pakistan and Governor of Sindh

Swatis of Mansehra 
 Babar Saleem Swati (MPA)
 Azam Swati (Senator and Minister)
 Saleh Muhammad Swati (MNA)
 Laiq Muhammad Swati ( MPA )
 Reham Khan Swati (BBC journalist)
 Abdul Hakeem Khan Swati (Ex-Governor KPK) 
 Waji-Uz-Zaman Khan ( Chief of Swatis)
 Khan Mohammad Abbas Khan (Former member of Indian National Congress, served as the Interim Mister (sic) for Industries, Freedom fighter and an Active Member of Pakistan Muslim League) (cousin of Haroon Khan Badshah)
 Haroon Khan Badshah (Member of Provincial Assembly of Khyber Pakhtunkhwa, ex-provincial Minister for Agriculture Khyber-Pakhtunkhwa)

Tanoli
 Mir Painda Khan
 Nawabzada Salahuddin Saeed Current Nawab of State of Amb
 Ibrar Hussain current MPA and ex Forest Minister

Tareen/Tarin
 Abdul Majid Khan Tarin, OBE, senior Muslim League figure.
 Ayub Khan, ex military dictator, second President of Pakistan (1958 – 1969)
 Begum Mahmooda Salim Khan, first female minister in the history of Pakistan
 Sardar Bahadur Khan, ex CM and minister
 Gohar Ayub Khan, former Speaker of the National Assembly and ex Foreign Minister
 Omar Ayub Khan, ex Minister of State for Finance
 Jehangir Khan Tareen, ex minister and political leader of the PTI party
 Shaukat Tarin, ex Federal Minister for Finance
 Yousuf Ayub Khan, politician and businessman

Zardari 

 Hakim Ali Zardari, the patriarch of Zardari family.
 Asif Ali Zardari, son of Hakim Ali Zardari and husband of Benazir Bhutto, President of Pakistan
 Bilawal Bhutto Zardari, son of Asif Ali Zardari and Benazir Bhutto, Chairman Pakistan Peoples Party(see also Bhutto family above)
 Azra Peechoho, daughter of Hakim Ali Zardari
 Faryal Talpur, daughter of Hakim Ali Zardari, Former Nazima Nawabshah District, MNA

Haq Jalandari Arain Family 
 Muhammad Zia-ul-Haq (President of Pakistan, 1978–1988)
 Muhammad Ijaz-ul-Haq (Member of the National Assembly)

See also 
 First Families of Pakistan	
 Politics of Pakistan

References 

 
Pakistan